Wen-Ying Tsai (October 13, 1928 – January 2, 2013) was a Chinese-American pioneer cybernetic sculptor and kinetic artist best known for creating sculptures using electric motors, stainless steel rods, stroboscopic light, and audio feedback control. As one of the first Chinese-born artists to achieve international recognition in the 1960s, Tsai was an inspiration to generations of Chinese artists around the world.

Early life and education

Wen-Ying Tsai was born in 1928 in Xiamen, Fujian, China. 
In 1939, he moved to Shanghai, to study chemical engineering at Ta Tung University. In 1949, he moved to Hong Kong, and then moved to the United States in 1950. He attended the University of Michigan, receiving a Bachelors in Mechanical Engineering (BSME) in 1953.

Engineer
Moving to New York City after graduation, Tsai began working as an architectural engineer for clients such as Walter Gropius, Mies van der Rohe, Synergetics, and Skidmore, Owings and Merrill. While working as an engineer by day, Tsai pursued artistic studies at the Art Students League at night, while also taking courses in political science and economics at the New School for Social Research. Tsai also attended modern dance classes with Erick Hawkins. In 1962, he became a US citizen.

Full-time artist
In 1963, Tsai won a John Hay Whitney Fellowship for Painting, after which he decided to leave engineering and devote himself full-time to the arts.  After a three-month trip in Europe, he returned to New York and began to make three-dimensional constructions using optical effects, fluorescent paints, and ultra-violet light.  These works were later selected for The Responsive Eye, an exhibition curated by William Seitz at the Museum of Modern Art in New York.

Unsatisfied with his static sculptures, Tsai began to introduce movement using motors. He created Multi-kinetic Wall in 1965, which was exhibited at the Amel Gallery (New York), and also shown in Art Turned On at the Institute of Contemporary Art, Boston.

Art historian Sam Hunter described the work:

But it was ultimately during a 1965 fellowship at the Edward MacDowell Colony in Peterborough, New Hampshire that Tsai had his "Eureka!" moment. While contemplating the sunlight shimmering in the trees, he had a sudden inspiration to use his engineering background to create art work that replicates natural phenomena. Finding a starting point in the work of constructivist artist Naum Gabo, Tsai decided that "the shimmering was not enough" and that what was needed was a way that the viewer could interact with the work. It was this realization that eventually led him to the idea to use a stroboscope coupled with a feedback control system.

Sam Hunter writes:

  
During this time, along with international friends including Takis, Tsai was a founding member of the Art Workers' Coalition that sought to implement museum reform and underscore "issues relating to the political and social responsibility of the art community".

In 1968, Tsai was invited by György Kepes to the Center for Advanced Visual Studies at MIT. There, amongst the "first Fellows", a lively group of like-minded artists (including Jack Burnham, Otto Piene, Takis, Harold Tovish, Stan VanDerBeek), Tsai met Harold "Doc" Edgerton, the engineer who developed the modern electronic stroboscope. Tsai remained at MIT CAVS until 1971.

In the early 1970s, Tsai moved with his family to Paris and showed with the Denise René Gallery and had extensive exhibitions in Europe. During these years, he befriended fellow Chinese artists residing in Paris including Peng Wan-Ts and Chu Teh-Chun and became very passionate about cultural exchange between China and the West. In 1979, Tsai and his friend the composer Wen-chung Chou were part of the first delegation of artists from the US to the People's Republic of China. This eventually lead Tsai and his wife Pei-De to establish The Committee for Chinese Artists Intercultural Movement (CCAIM), a pioneering non-profit organization that brought mainland Chinese artists to exhibit in the United States in the 1980s. 

After Paris, Tsai settled permanently in New York City. In 2006, Tsai and Pei-De established the Tsai Art and Science Foundation to support and bring awareness to endeavors that are at the intersection of the arts and sciences.

Works

Tsai's cybernetic sculpture works have always been a challenge for writers to describe. Art critic Robert Hughes evokes them vividly:

A grove of slender stainless-steel rods rises from a plate. This base vibrates at 30 cycles per second; the rods flex rapidly, in harmonic curves. The rods appear to move; there is a shimmering, a flashing, an eerie ballet of metal, whose apparent movements range from stillness to jittering, and back to a slow, indescribably sensuous undulation

 
The philosopher Vilem Flusser wrote of Tsai's work:

 There can be no doubt that Tsai is a great artist. Not because what he does is pleasant, or because he proposes a play, or because he represents the spirit of our times, but because he reveals to us, through artifice or works of art, the concrete experience of a future full of promise or abysmal danger. 

Jonathan Benthall was one of the first to appreciate Tsai's sculpture. In 1968, he wrote:

The work of art may be regarded as a machine programmed by the artist to produce a deferred output. That is why an artist like Tsai is likely to be so valuable; not because he is an innovator (all his techniques taken separately have been used before) but because he has the kind of authority that establishes a stylistic tradition.

Tsai's interactive sculpture marked a major step in the development of kinetic art:

Tsai is a Chinese-born sculptor now living in New York. The slender, stainless steel "cybernetic" rods of his sculpture vibrate in different patterns in response to electronic impulses, to the clapping of human hands, or to the flashes of a strobe light. In the artist's words, they are designed to simulate "the intensity of a living creature".

Frank Popper elaborates:

As far as the sensory experience of the spectator goes, the most outstanding American kinetic artist is unquestionably the Chinese-born Wen-Ying Tsai. His pieces, which are perfect on the technological level,ous celebration' which is re-created in their presence. As he concludes: 'Rhythm is friendship and in Tsai's work there is friendship of light, sound and our own heart-beats.

Richard Kostelanetz writes about Tsai's cybernetic water works:

Of his other kinetic sculptures, Upward-Falling Fountain (1979) is the most impressive, creating an illusion that must be seen to be believed. . 

In conclusion, Frank Popper writes in his "Electra" exhibition catalog about Tsai's essential contribution:

The role played by Tsai, the American artist of Chinese origin, in this context cannot be overestimated, in his most varied cybernetic sculptures in the Electra exhibition are perfect examples of an artistic comment, perhaps an artistic solution to one of the principal problems raised in this show: the situation of the artist between technology, at a critical point of its passage from the mechanical to the electronic era, and man's natural or artificial environment...

East and West
Vilem Flusser's analysis of Tsai's work delves into his place in both the Eastern and Western traditions.

 Possibly Tsai himself does not stand within Western tradition. The analysis of his phenomena seems to reveal this. In that case the arguments just advanced cannot touch him. Possibly he stands within an Oriental tradition, for which (so at least it looks like to a Western observer) man is not a being radically separated form all others. For such a tradition man may feel deeply united with animals, plants, and other types of beings. He can therefore, conceive of them much more as "others" than we can. And the phenomena Tsai produces are then, in their naive, plant-like Gestalten, "true others" If I can dialogue with a plant (and Oriental tradition seems to suggest this), then a fortiori, I can dialogue with the phenomena Tsai is producing. Such an hypothesis of Tsai's position would explain his approach to the problem posed by the series "thing-other". He could then still see others (even in a stone), where we no longer can see them. In this case Tsai may say that his is an important Oriental contribution to the Western (and bankrupt) attempt to free man from the determining effects of objects of culture. He may say that he is using Western models and Western methods from an Oriental approach, in order to try and solve the universally human problem of freedom from determination. And he will be completely correct in thus answering the above advanced objections.

Tsai and Taoism
Art historian Donald Kuspit finds in Tsai's art a Taoist outlook:

Personal life
Tsai met his wife, Pei-De Chang, in New York City in 1967. They were married in London in 1968 during the Cybernetic Serendipity exhibition in which Tsai participated. The couple had twin sons two years later when Tsai was a Fellow at the Center for Advanced Visual Studies at MIT; their friend Otto Piene is fond of recalling that the Tsais' twins were the first of the "Center babies".

The Tsai family spent part of the 1970s in Paris before settling down permanently in SoHo, New York where they lived in a loft space that they renovated themselves. Richard Kostelanetz has written about the Tsais in SoHo in his book SoHo: The Rise and Fall of an Artists' Colony.

Death
Tsai died in Manhattan, New York, on January 2, 2013. He was survived by his wife Pei-De; sons and spouses Lun-Yi London (Michelle) and Ming-Yi Gyorgy (Marloes); grandchildren Sakhaya, Kelsyn, Lina, Flora and Nereus. Artist Otto Piene and composer Wen-chung Chou were among those who spoke at Tsai's funeral service.

Collections
 

Addison Gallery of American Art, Andover, Massachusetts
Albright-Knox Art Gallery, Buffalo, New York
Butler Institute of American Art, Youngstown, Ohio
Centre National des Arts Plastiques, Paris, France
Centre Pompidou, Paris, France
Chrysler Museum of Art, Provincetown, Massachusetts
David Bermant Foundation, California
Franklin Institute, Philadelphia, Pennsylvania
Great Explorations, St. Petersburg, Florida
MIT List Visual Arts Center, Massachusetts Institute of Technology
Israel Museum, Jerusalem
Kaiser Wilhelm Museum, Krefeld, Germany
Kanagawa Science Park, Kanagawa Prefecture, Japan
Kunsthalle Nuremberg, Germany
Lannon Foundation, California
Malcolm Forbes Foundation, New York
Memorial Art Gallery, Rochester, New York
Musée d'Art Moderne de la Ville de Paris
Museo de Arte Contemporaneo de Caracas, Venezuela
Museum für Holographie, Pulheim/Köln, Germany
Princeton University Art Museum, Princeton University, New Jersey

Museo de Bellas Artes, Caracas, Venezuela
Nagoya City Art Museum, Nagoya, Japan
National Taiwan Museum of Fine Arts, Taichung, Taiwan
Oklahoma City Museum of Art, Oklahoma
Ontario Science Center, Toronto
Orlando Science Center, Orlando, Florida
Shirahama Energy Land, Matsushita Electric Co. (Panasonic), Shirahama, Japan
Tate Gallery, London
University of Alberta Museums, Canada
Whitney Museum of American Art, New York City

Selected exhibitions

Solo
1961 Ruth Sherman Gallery, New York

1964 & 1965 Amel Gallery, New York

1968 Howard Wise Gallery, New York

1970 Alpha Gallery
Museum Haus Lange, Krefeld, Germany

1971 Hayden Gallery, Massachusetts Institute of Technology
Ontario Science Center, Toronto
Galérie Françoise Mayer, Brussels
University of Pittsburgh
Michael Berger Gallery, Pittsburgh, PA

1972 Galérie Denise René, Paris
Corcoran Gallery of Art, Washington, DC
Galérie Denise René, New York

1973 Galérie Denise René/Hans Mayer, Düsseldorf. 
Musee d'Art Contemporain, Montreal.

1975 Museo de Arte Contemporaneo de Caracas, Venezuela.

1978 Wildenstein Art Center, Houston.
Museo de Bellas Artes, Caracas.

1979 Hong Kong Museum of Art.

1980 Isetan Museum of Art, Tokyo.

1983 Galerie Denise Rene, Paris.

1989 National Museum of History, Taipei.

1990 Taiwan Museum of Art, Taichung, Taiwan.

1997 National Museum of China, Beijing, China.

Group
1965
"The Responsive Eye", Museum of Modern Art, New York
"The New Eyes", Chrysler Art Museum, Provincetown, Massachusetts
City Art Museum of St. Louis
"Art in Science", Albany Institute of History and Art
"Art Turned On", Institute of Contemporary Art, Boston.
"Art in Science", organized by Smithsonian Institution, Washington
DC
National Academy of Science, Washington, DC

1968 
"Cybernetic Serendipity", Institute of Contemporary Arts, London.
"The Machine as Seen at the End of the Mechanical Age", Museum of Modern Art, New York

1969
"Cybernetic Serendipity", Corcoran Gallery of Art,
Washington, DC
"Howard Lipman Collection", Whitney Museum of
American Art, New York.
"Master Pieces of Modern Art", Galerie Denise Rene/Hans
Mayer, Krefeld, Germany.
"Explorations", Hayden Gallery, Massachusetts Institute of
Technology National Collection of Fine Arts, Smithsonian
Institution, Washington, DC
3e Salon International des Galeries Pilotes, Cantonal Museum of Fine Arts, Lausanne
Musee d'Art Moderne, Paris.
Pittsburgh International, Museum of Art, Carnegie Institute,
Pittsburgh.
"Struktur Schwingung Dynarnik", Kunsthalle, Nuremberg.
"L'Art et les Technologies", Ville de Vitry-sur-Seine, France.
"Multiple Interaction Team", Museum of Science and Industry,
Chicago
"Salon International des Composants Electroniques", Paris.
"Custom and Culture", US Custom House, New York.
"Art of the Space Era", Huntsville Museum of Art, Alabama.
"The Expanding Visual World", The Museum of Fun,
Asahi Shimbun, Tokyo.

1983"Electra", Musee d'Art Moderne, Paris.

1984 "Carte Blanche Denise Rene". Paris.

1986 "Les Machines Sentimentales", Avignon.
"La Biennale Di Venezia", Venice.
"Energetic Art", La Malmaison, Cannes.

1987 "Artware, Kunst und Elektronik", Hanover International Fair.
"Artware", Düsseldorf Landsmuseum.
"Art in the Computer Age", Everson Museum of Art,
Syracuse, New York.
"Art in the Computer Age", Cincinnati Contemporary Art
Center, Cincinnati, Ohio.

1988 "Computers and Art", IBM Gallery of Science and Art,
New York.
"Lights OROT", Yeshiva University Museum, New York.
"Interaction", The Aldrich Museum of Contemporary Art,
Connecticut.
"Vraiment Faux", La Fondation Cartier, Jouey-en-Jossas,
France.
"Art Construit, Lumiere, Mouvement", EPAD, Galerie La
Defense, Paris.
"Art in the Computer Age", Center for the Fine Arts, Miami.

1989 "Phenomena Art", Pan-Asian Expo '89, Saibu Gas Museum,
Fukuoka, Japan.
KSP, Kawasaka - Kanagawa Prefecture.
"Visiona", Vienna Messe-WienerFestwochen.
"Visiona", Zurich.

1990 "Image du Futur", Montreal, Canada.

1991 "ARTEC '91, The International Biennale in Nagoya, Japan.

1995 "Kwangju International Biennale" in Korea.
"Osaka Triennale 1995" - Sculpture.

2001 
"Denise René, l'intrépide", Centre Georges Pompidou, Paris

2008 
"Olympic Games, 2008", Beijing

2010 
"Expo 2010 Shanghai", Shanghai Art Museum, Shanghai

See also
 Otto Piene

Further reading

1968 
Tsai, Cybernetic Sculpture at Howard Wise Gallery, Arts Magazine 42/8 (Summer). 
"Some More Beginnings", Experiments in Art and Technology. New York. 
A. S. Parisi, "The Kinetic Movement: Technology Paces the Arts", Product Engineering 39/25 (December). 
D. K. Merris, "The Engineer and His Profession", Product Engineering 39/25 (December).
K. G. Pontus-Hulten, "The Machine as Seen at the End of the Mechanical Age", exhibition catalog, Museum of Modern Art, New York.

1969 
J. Chandler, "Art in the Electric Age", Art International Xlll/2 (February). 
F. Newgan, "Die Maschine in der Kunst", Kunstweek 22/43 (February). 
Jonathan Benthall, "Cybernetic Sculpture of Tsai", Studio International, 177/909 (March). 

1970
"Explorations", National Collection of Fine Arts, 1/2 (May). 
B. E. Bradin. "Tsai-bernetics", Boston Arts, 3/6 (June). 
Frank Popper, L'Art cinetique. Gautier-Villars. 

1971
Irmeline Lebeer, "Les Sculptures Cybernetiques de Wen-Ying Tsai", Chroniques de L'Art Vivant 26 (December)  Nicolas Calas, lcons+lmages of the Sixties. Ed. Dutton. 

1972
Jasia Reichardt, "Engineer Extraordinary", New Scientist 52/777 (January). 
J. Benthall, Science and Technology in Art Today. Ed. Thames & Hudson, London. 
Robert Hughes, "Shaped by Strobe", Time (October 2) 

1973
H. Dufrenne, "L'Art en Occident", Le Coumer, UNESCO (March). 
Sam Hunter, American Art of the Twentieth Century, Ed. H. Abrams.

1974 
J. Reichardt, "Twenty Years of Symbiosis Between Art and Science", Impact on Society, UNESCO (January–March). 
Vilem Flusser, "Aspects and Prospects of Tsai's Work", Art International (March). 
J. Benthall, "Cybernetic Sculpture of Tsai", Art International (March 1974). 

1975 
J. Reichardt, Le Temps et la Cybernetique. Ed. Micromegas. 
F. Popper, Art. Action. Participation (tome 1). Ed. Dumond Schauberg
F. Popper, La Creativite. Aujourd'hui (tome II). Ed. Dumont Schauberg
F. Popper, Die Kinetische Kunst und lhre Folgen (tome III). Ed. Dumont Schauberg. 
L. P. S. Resumen 12 October 1975, Caracas. 

1977
S. Lee, "The World of Tsai", Lion Art, Taipei (January). 
C. Wong, "Electronic Sculpture of Tsai", Ming Pao Monthly 136 Hong Kong (April). 
Liu Nien-Ling, "Cybernetic Sculpture of Tsai", ~BB~BW, (November). 

1979
Itsuo Sakane, A Museum of Fun. Asahi Shimbun, Tokyo. 
Sunny and Horace Yuen, South-North Pole. 1Jtfi 107 (April). 

1983
J. Benthall, "Les Sculptures Cibernetiques de Tsai", Cimaise No. 162-163. 
F. Popper. "La Palette du Me Siecle", Revue Franpase de L'Electricite (December) 
Michael Gibson, International Herald Tribune, December 15, Paris. 

1984 
A. Liot. Art Press (January) Paris. 
C.Winter-Irving, "Cybernetic Sculpture", Craft Arts (October), Australia. 
J. Benthall, "The Promises of Technological Art", Landmark Program, Dallas. 

1985
Mp. Prat, "Les faits culturels", Encyclopaedia Universalis. 
Shu Zhang. "Shi Jie Meishu", World Art (December), Beijing. 

1987
John Woodford, "The Electrifying Artist", Michigan Today (February). 
Cynthia Goodman, Digital Visions: Computers and Art. Abrams. 
David Galloway, Artware - Kunst und Elecktronik. Econ Verlag. 

1988
J. Beil, "Waterworks", OMNI (June) L. Lothian, Abstract Computerism, (June). 
Les Krantz, The New York Art Review. 
M. Mifflin, "Off-the-Wall Art", ELLE (September) 
J. Fodor, "Wired for Sound", OMNI (September) 
D. Galloway, "Asthtik des Immateriellen", Kunstforum (December) 
Yeshiva University Museum, "Light OROT CAVS/M.I.T." 
E.Goldring, Otto Piene und das CAVS/M.I.T. Deutscher Kunstlerbund, Karlsruhe. 

1989
T.S. Liang, "Tsai's Motion Sensitive Sculptures", Hsiung Shih Art Monthly, October '89. Taipei. 
S. Hunter, "The Cybernetic Sculpture ofTsai Wen-Ying", National Museum of History, Taipei. 

1991
The 2nd International Biennale in Nagova - ARTEC '91. Nagoya City Art Museum. 
Contemporary Masterworks. St. James Press. 

1993
Richard Kostelanetz, Dictionary of the Avant-Gardes. Capella. 
F. Popper, Art of the Electronic Age. Abrams. 

1994
Mu Ling, "Tsai's Cybernetic Art", Ming Pao Monthly (January), Hong Kong. 

1995
Paul DeGroot and Dick Oliver, Internet Graphics Gallery. QUE. 

1996
Contemporary Artists, 4th edition, St. James Press. 
T. Grieder, Artist and Audience, 2nd edition, Brown & Benchmark publishers.

2001
R. Kostelanetz, Dictionary of the Avant-Gardes, Second Edition, Routledge.

2003
R. Kostelanetz, SoHo: The Rise and Fall of an Artists' Colony'', Routledge.

References

External links

 www.tsaifoundation.org Tsai Foundation

1928 births
2013 deaths
Avant-garde art
Interactive art
American abstract artists
20th-century American sculptors
21st-century American sculptors
American male sculptors
American contemporary artists
American artists of Chinese descent
MacDowell Colony fellows
Massachusetts Institute of Technology fellows
Art Students League of New York alumni
Artists from New York City
University of Michigan College of Engineering alumni
Burials at Kensico Cemetery
Sculptors from New York (state)
Chinese emigrants to the United States
Artists from Fujian
People from Xiamen
People from SoHo, Manhattan